Phostria is a genus of moths of the family Crambidae.

Species
Phostria aengusalis Schaus, 1927
Phostria alberici (Dufrane, 1945)
Phostria albescentalis Hampson, 1918
Phostria albirenalis (Hampson, 1899)
Phostria aterrimalis Hampson, 1918
Phostria atrisignalis (Hampson, 1912)
Phostria bistigmalis (Strand, 1913)
Phostria buckleyi (Druce, 1902)
Phostria calydon Druce, 1885
Phostria caniusalis (Walker, 1859)
Phostria celsusalis Schaus, 1927
Phostria chrysomera Hampson, 1918
Phostria citrinalis (Druce, 1895)
Phostria clementalis (Schaus, 1912)
Phostria cleodalis Schaus, 1920
Phostria concolor (C. Felder, R. Felder & Rogenhofer, 1875)
Phostria crithonalis (Walker, 1859)
Phostria delilalis (Walker, 1859)
Phostria diffusimarginalis (Hampson, 1899)
Phostria discipunctalis (Hampson, 1903)
Phostria dispila Ghesquière, 1940
Phostria dohrnii (Snellen, 1881)
Phostria druonalis Schaus, 1927
Phostria earlalis (Swinhoe, 1906)
Phostria euagra (C. Felder, R. Felder & Rogenhofer, 1875)
Phostria euryleucalis Hampson, 1918
Phostria flavipectus (Bethune-Baker, 1909)
Phostria fumarialis (Dewitz, 1881)
Phostria glyphodoides (Hampson, 1912)
Phostria gravitalis (Saalmüller, 1880)
Phostria hampsonialis Schaus, 1920
Phostria hesusalis (Walker, 1859)
Phostria indignalis Schaus, 1920
Phostria internervalis Hampson, 1918
Phostria jansei West, 1931
Phostria latiapicalis (Schaus, 1912)
Phostria ledereralis (Strand, 1920)
Phostria leucophasma (Dyar, 1912)
Phostria linealis (Guenée, 1854)
Phostria lithosialis (Guenée, 1854)
Phostria luridalis Ghesquière, 1942
Phostria luridombrina Ghesquière, 1942
Phostria maculicostalis Hampson, 1893
Phostria mapetalis (Schaus, 1912)
Phostria marginalis Amsel, 1956
Phostria mediospilota Ghesquière, 1942
Phostria melanophthalma Meyrick, 1933
Phostria memmialoides Amsel, 1956
Phostria mendelalis (Druce, 1902)
Phostria metalobalis (Hampson, 1912)
Phostria microselene (Hampson, 1918)
Phostria monotona Amsel, 1956
Phostria mungalis (Plötz, 1880)
Phostria nicoalis (Walker, 1859)
Phostria oajacalis (Walker, 1866)
Phostria obliqualis (Schaus, 1912)
Phostria obscurata (Moore, 1885)
Phostria ocellalis (Aurivillius, 1925)
Phostria orientalis (Snellen, 1901)
Phostria persiusalis (Walker, 1859)
Phostria phaennisalis (Walker, 1859)
Phostria phryganurus (C. Felder, R. Felder & Rogenhofer, 1875)
Phostria primulosalis Schaus, 1927
Phostria purpuralis (Druce, 1895)
Phostria purpureonitens Hampson, 1918
Phostria quadriguttata (Walker, 1869)
Phostria radicalis (Walker, 1866)
Phostria regalis (Butler, 1882)
Phostria rufalis (Schaus, 1912)
Phostria rutilalis (Walker, 1869)
Phostria samealis (Hampson, 1912)
Phostria schediusalis (Walker, 1859)
Phostria sericealis (Pagenstecher, 1900)
Phostria sexguttata (Holland, 1920)
Phostria soricalis (Snellen, 1899)
Phostria stygichroa (Bethune-Baker, 1909)
Phostria syleptalis (Strand, 1918)
Phostria tamsina Ghesquière, 1942
Phostria tedea (Stoll in Cramer & Stoll, 1780)
Phostria temira (Stoll in Cramer & Stoll, 1781)
Phostria tetrastictalis (Hampson, 1912)
Phostria tridentalis (Hampson, 1912)
Phostria truncatalis (Hampson, 1912)
Phostria umbrina Ghesquière, 1942
Phostria varialis (Walker, 1862)
Phostria vitrifera (Dognin, 1911)
Phostria xanthoproctalis Hampson, 1918
Phostria xipharesalis (Walker, 1859)

Former species
Phostria harutai Inoue, 1955

References

 
Spilomelinae
Crambidae genera
Taxa named by Jacob Hübner